Thabeban is a suburb  of Bundaberg in the Bundaberg Region, Queensland, Australia. In the  Thabeban had a population of 2,840 people.

Geography 
The Bundaberg Ring Road passes from east to west through Thabeban, while the North Coast railway line passes from south to north. Although there is a Thabeban railway station, it is not in the suburb but on the border of the suburbs to the north, Norville and Avenell Heights.

History 
Thabeban State School opened on 30 April 1917.

St Luke's Anglican church was dedicated by Assistant Bishop Schultz on 27 May 1984. Its closure on 21 February 2004 was approved by Assistant Bishop Appleby.

In the  Thabeban had a population of 2,840 people.

Education 
Thabeban State School is a government primary (Prep-6) school for boys and girls at 270 Goodwood Road. In 2018, the school had an enrolment of 138 students with 12 teachers (10 full-time equivalent) and 29 non-teaching staff (19 full-time equivalent).

References 

Suburbs of Bundaberg
Bundaberg Region